The following lists events that happened during 1926 in Chile.

Incumbents
President of Chile: Emiliano Figueroa

Events

June
 An exceptionally stormy and unsettled month in Central Chile produces the wettest and cloudiest month for which reliable records exist in Santiago, where a total of  falls (more than the average annual rainfall) and no more than 51 sunny hours occur all month.

October
12 October to 3 November – The 1926 South American Championship is held in Santiago.

Births 
14 April – George Robledo (d. 1989)
26 May – Antonio Prieto (actor) (d. 2011)
20 August – Augusto Barcia (d. 2001)
20 December – Misael Escuti (d. 1995)
29 December – Lautaro Murúa (d. 1926)

Deaths
20 October – Agustín Ross (b. 1844)
16 December – Hernán Trizano (b. 1860)

References 

 
Years of the 20th century in Chile
Chile